Dynein, axonemal, heavy chain 14 is a protein that in humans is encoded by the DNAH14 gene.

Function 

Dyneins are microtubule-associated motor protein complexes composed of several heavy, light, and intermediate chains. Two major classes of dyneins, axonemal and cytoplasmic, have been identified. DNAH14 is an axonemal dynein heavy chain (DHC) (Vaughan et al., 1996 [PubMed 8812413]).

References 

Motor proteins